The 2001 European Speedway Club Champions' Cup.

Group A

 May 27, 2001
  Daugavpils

Final

 September 16, 2001
  Daugavpils

See also

2001
Euro C